ASK Rīga is a former professional basketball club that was based in Riga, Latvia.  "ASK" stood for "Armijas Sporta Klubs" (in English: Army Sports Club).

History 
BK Rīga  was then founded in 2004, and it got back the original name of ASK Rīga on March 23, 2006, which was supported by the Riga City Council, the National Latvian Army Forces, and some powerful sponsors, as well as the brand new Arēna Rīga, with room for 12,500 fans.

The team then made it to both the Baltic League and the FIBA EuroCup quarterfinals, but the best was yet to come. The arrival of Torraye Braggs happened to be the key piece in a roster already featuring Sandis Valters, Raitis Grafs, Curtis Millage, A.J. Bramlett, and Sandis Buškevics. ASK won the best-of-seven 2006–07 Latvian League finals 4–2, and started a new era for the club, breaking BK Ventspils's seven-year Latvian League dynasty. ASK hosted the EuroCup's 2007–08 opening game, but a plague of injuries did not allow the team to reach the competition's elimination rounds. In that season same 2007–08 season, ASK Rīga finished fourth in the Baltic League, and also finished in 3rd place in the Latvian League. The 2008–09 season was the last season of ASK Rīga to date.

Arena 
ASK Rīga played its home games at the 12,500 seat Arēna Rīga.

Honours

Domestic competitions 
 Latvian League
 Winners (1): 2006–07

Notable players 

 Sandis Buškevics (28)
 Dairis Bertāns (45)
 Gatis Jahovičs (9)
 Kaspars Kambala (34)
 Roberts Štelmahers (7)
 Sandis Valters (10)
 Arnis Vecvagars (15)
 Uģis Viļums (7)
 Uvis Helmanis (4)
 Raitis Grafs (5)
 Ernests Kalve (11)
 Aigars Vītols (55)
 Darius Lukminas
 Martynas Andriukaitis (13)
 Steponas Babrauskas (11)
 Vytautas Danelius
 Marius Runkauskas (10)
 Andrius Mažutis (12)
 Milutin Aleksić (7)
 Bruno Šundov (14)
 Marko Antonijević
 Smiljan Pavič
 Torraye Braggs (32)
 A. J. Bramlett  (42)
 Corey L. Brewer (31)
 Dwayne Broyles (8)
 Ricardo Marsh (21)
 Curtis Millage (14)
 Aerick Sanders (34)
 Sean Colson (8)

List of ASK Rīga players

Notable coaches 
 Ramunas Butautas
 Vakidis

Notes

References

External links 
EuroCup Team Page
FIBA Europe Team Page
Baltic League Team Page
Latvian League Team Page 

Basketball teams in Latvia
Sport in Riga
Basketball teams established in 1929
Basketball teams established in 2005
Basketball teams in the Soviet Union